The 2015–16 St. John's Red Storm women's basketball team represented St. John's University during the 2015–16 NCAA Division I women's basketball season. The Red Storm, led by fourth-year head coach Joe Tartamella, played their games at Carnesecca Arena and were members of the Big East Conference. They finished the season 23–10, 11–7 in Big East play to finish in fourth place. They won the Big East tournament title for the first time since 1988 and earn an automatic trip to the NCAA women's tournament where they lost to Auburn in the first round.

Roster

Schedule

|-
!colspan=9 style="background:#BA0C2F; color:#FFFFFF;"| Non-conference regular season

|-
!colspan=9 style="background:#BA0C2F; color:#FFFFFF;"| Big East regular season

|-
!colspan=9 style="background:#BA0C2F;"| Big East Women's Tournament

|-
!colspan=9 style="background:#BA0C2F;"| NCAA Women's Tournament

Rankings
2015–16 NCAA Division I women's basketball rankings

See also
 2015–16 St. John's Red Storm men's basketball team

References

St. John's
St. John's Red Storm women's basketball seasons
St. John's
Saint John's
Saint John's